Put the Shine On is the seventh studio album by American musical group CocoRosie, released by Marathon Artists on March 13, 2020.

Recording
Put the Shine On was recorded primarily in San Francisco, California. The album's sound has notable hip hop influence, as the Casady sisters had worked with rapper Chance the Rapper on his album The Big Day prior. The sisters worked on the album between visits to their mother, Christina Chalmers, who died eleven days after providing backing vocals for the track “Ruby Red".

Critical reception
Put the Shine On received mixed reviews. Sasha Geffen of Pitchfork gave the album a rating of 5.1 out of 10, describing it as an "incoherent melange" and "a return to their maximalist tendencies, piling on drum machines, chintzy synthesizers, over-the-top raps, and nu-metal guitars". The review stated that the album's "complicated tone... gets blunted in the record's production," and notes the use of "stock hip-hop beats", "clumsy synth bass", "rhythmic elements", "fuzz bass", "distorted power chords", "harp loops", and lyrical content involving concepts like "generational trauma, mental illness, and sexual violence".

At Metacritic, which assigns a weighted average rating out of 100 to reviews from mainstream publications, this release received an average score of 58, based on 5 reviews.

Track listing

Charts

References

2020 albums
CocoRosie albums
Marathon Artists albums